Christopher John Minns (born 17 September 1979) is an Australian politician who is the leader of the NSW Labor Party. He was elected to the New South Wales Legislative Assembly as the member for Kogarah for the Labor Party at the 2015 New South Wales state election. Minns was previously a Labor Party official, a ministerial adviser, a firefighter and at a youth mental health charity. He has served as a Shadow Minister in the opposition frontbench.

Early and personal life
The son of a school principal, Minns was raised in the St George region of Sydney, where he studied at Marist College Kogarah. He holds an undergraduate degree from the University of New England in Armidale and attended Princeton University in the United States where he was awarded a Masters in Public Policy (2012–13).

Minns is married and has three sons with his wife Anna. Upon his return from Princeton, while his wife pursued her own business opportunities, Minns became the carer of his sons before nominating for Parliament.

Minns has previously worked in the charity sector for a youth mental health charity, as a firefighter, as an advisor in the NSW Government and as the Assistant Secretary of the NSW Labor Party. Minns was first elected to office in 2004 as a Penshurst Ward councillor of the Hurstville City Council, and was elected for a term as deputy mayor in 2007–2008. 

He joined the Australian Labor Party in 1998 when he was 18 years old and was elected as the Member for Kogarah in 2015.

Political career
Minns was first elected to office in 2004 as a Penshurst Ward councillor of the Hurstville City Council, and was elected for a term as deputy mayor in 2007–2008; he left council at the 2008 election after serving a single term. He also worked on the staff of Carl Scully and John Robertson.

Minns is a member of Labor's Right faction and was assistant secretary of the NSW Labor Party. He is opposed to legislation that would enable voluntary euthanasia. In his inaugural speech in the Legislative Assembly, Minns criticised the state government’s sale of NSW’s electricity assets and called for mandatory Mandarin Chinese lessons in New South Wales schools. Additionally, Minns called for a reduction in union influence in the Labor Party in favour of "increasing representation of ordinary members of our party who have more diverse voices", stating that while trade unions were integral to the success and heritage of the Labor Party, the party also needs to represent those who are not in a trade union, and that will mean taking steps to reduce union control on Labor's conference floor. Bob Nanva, national secretary of the Rail, Tram and Bus Union, while acknowledging that Minns had been "an extraordinarily effective Assistant General Secretary of the ALP", rebuked him for being "seriously mistaken" on his views about unions. Additionally, both Mark Buttigieg and NSW Labor Party secretary Jamie Clements disagreed with Minns' contention regarding unions. By 2019, Minns no longer held those views.

Shadow Minister
In March 2016, a reshuffle of the shadow ministry following the resignation of Linda Burney resulted in Minns being appointed Shadow Minister for Water, replacing Mick Veitch.

Following Luke Foley's resignation as NSW Labor leader and leader of the NSW opposition, Minns nominated for the roles. On 10 November 2018, Minns lost the leadership spill to Michael Daley, 33 votes to 12. Later, Minns lost the leadership election to Jodi McKay on a combined caucus and party membership vote of 39.5% to 60.5%. He was appointed to the portfolios of transport and corrections in the shadow cabinet.

2021 leadership challenge
Following Labor's defeat at the Upper Hunter by-election in May 2021 and a possible leadership challenge to McKay, a file titled Why Chris Minns and Jamie Clements can never run the NSW Labor Party was circulated from the office of deputy Labor leader Yasmin Catley. Minns was disappointed with the lack of explanation or communication from McKay and Catley over the file circulation, and resigned from shadow cabinet on 26 May. He was the second MP to resign from shadow cabinet in two days after shadow treasurer Walt Secord, a close supporter of Minns. On 31 May 2021, after McKay resigned as party leader, Minns announced he would run for party leadership. If Michael Daley and Minns had contested for party leadership, it would have been Minns’ third leadership contest and his second one versus Daley. Minns’ leadership bid was publicly supported by more than a dozen senior Labor MPs including Penny Sharpe, Ryan Park, Jihad Dib, and Prue Car. On 4 June 2021, Michael Daley pulled out of the leadership contest, allowing Minns to be elected to the position of leader unopposed.

Opposition Leader
In the 2023 New South Wales election campaign, Minns has made election promises to invest further into public services. He has been criticised for being reluctant to promise reform on money laundering in gambling, however on the 16th of January Minns released a plan to reform gambling, banning donations from clubs (gambling organisations) to political parties and promising a cashless gaming card trial, which would last for 12 months and cover 500 of the approximately 86,480 (0.58%) pokies machines (slots).

See also
Shadow Ministry of Chris Minns

References

1979 births
Living people
Australian Labor Party members of the Parliament of New South Wales
Labor Right politicians
Members of the New South Wales Legislative Assembly
University of New England (Australia) alumni
Princeton University alumni
Australian Labor Party councillors
Deputy mayors of places in Australia
21st-century Australian politicians